The  was a railway line of West Japan Railway Company between Nishiwaki and Taka District all within Hyōgo Prefecture, Japan. The line closed on April 1, 1990.

Stations

Notes
1: Nomura Station was renamed Nishiwakishi Station upon closure of the Kajiya Line.
2: The former town of Naka became a part of the town of Taka in 2005.

History
The  opened the line between 1913 and 1923.

Under the operation of Japanese National Railways (JNR), freight services ceased in 1974. JR West succeeded the line in 1987 and closed it in 1990, concurrently with the Miyazu Line and the Taisha Line, as the last of 83 "specified local lines" selected for closure.

References
This article incorporates material from the corresponding article in the Japanese Wikipedia.

Rail transport in Hyōgo Prefecture
Lines of West Japan Railway Company
Closed railway lines
Railway lines closed in 1990